The Tsinghua Bamboo Strips are a collection of Chinese texts dating to the Warring States period and written in ink on strips of bamboo, that were acquired in 2008 by Tsinghua University, China. The texts were obtained by illegal excavation, probably of a tomb in the area of Hubei or Hunan province, and were then acquired and donated to the university by an alumnus. The very large size of the collection and the significance of the texts for scholarship make it one of the most important discoveries of early Chinese texts to date.

On 7 January 2014 the journal Nature announced that a portion of the Tsinghua Bamboo Strips represent "the world's oldest example" of a decimal multiplication table.

Discovery, conservation and publication
The Tsinghua Bamboo Strips (TBS) were donated to Tsinghua University in July 2008 by an alumnus of the university. The precise location(s) and date(s) of the illicit excavation that yielded the strips remain(s) unknown. An article in the Guangming Daily named the donor as Zhao Weiguo, and stated that the texts were purchased at "a foreign auction", Neither the name of the auction house, nor the location or sum involved in the transaction were mentioned. Li Xueqin, the director of the conservation and research project, has stated that the wishes of the alumnus to maintain his identity secret will be respected.

Similarities with previous discoveries, such as the manuscripts from the Guodian tomb, indicate that the TBS came from a mid-to-late Warring States Period (480–221BC) tomb in the region of China culturally dominated at that time by the Chu state. A single radiocarbon date (305±30BC) and the style of ornament on the accompanying box are in keeping with this conclusion. By the time they reached the university, the strips were badly affected by mold. Conservation work on the strips was carried out, and a Center for Excavated Texts Research and Preservation was established at Tsinghua on April 25, 2009. There are 2388 strips altogether in the collection, including a number of fragments.

A series of articles discussing the TBS, intended for an educated but non-specialist Chinese audience, appeared in the Guangming Daily during late 2008 and 2009. The first volume of texts (photographic reproductions, transcriptions, and commentary) was published by the Tsinghua team in 2010.

The texts
Several of the TBS texts are similar to the received Shang Shu, a miscellany of documents from various dates in the first millennium BC that were transmitted as a canonical collection from the Han dynasty onwards. In some cases, a TBS text can be found in the received Shang Shu, with only variations in wording, title or orthography. Such examples include versions of the "Jin Teng", "Kang Gao" and "Gu Ming" chapters of the Shang Shu. The majority of Shang Shu-style TBS texts, however, are not found in the received Shang Shu, either having been "lost" in the process of transmission, or else never having been incorporated into the canonical collection.

An annalistic history recording events from the beginning of the Western Zhou (mid-11th century BC) through to the early Warring States period (mid-5th century) is said to be similar in form and content to the received Bamboo Annals.

Another text running across 14 strips recounts a celebratory gathering of the Zhou elite in the 8th year of the reign of King Wu of Zhou, prior to their conquest of the Shang dynasty. The gathering takes place in the ancestral temple of King Wen of Zhou, King Wu's father, and consisted of beer drinking and the recitation of hymns in the style of the received Shi Jing.

The Admonition of Protection
Among the TBS texts in the style of the received Shang Shu, is one that has been titled "The Admonition of Protection" ("Bao Xun" 保訓). This was the first text for which anything approaching a complete description and transcription was published. The text purports to be a record of a deathbed admonition by the Zhou king Wen Wang to his son and heir, Wu Wang. Although the team working on the text refers to it as "The Admonition of Protection" (or "Protector's Admonition", 保训), their transcription of the text refers to a "Precious Admonition" (Bao Xun) and that may be the more appropriate editorial title.
The content of the king's speech revolves around a concept of The Middle (Zhong 中) which seems to refer to an avoidance of extremes and an ability to consider multiple points of view. The king narrates a story of the sage-king Shun acquiring The Middle by living a modest, thoughtful life, and a more puzzling second tale which describes the Shang ancestor Wei "borrowing The Middle from the River."

Texts by volume

Volume two 
It includes one text only, the "Xinian" 繫年 (系年), probably composed ca. 370 BC. This text relates key events of Zhou history.  It comprises 138 strips in a relatively well preserved condition. Among the contents they transmit is an account of the origin of Qin by supporters of the Shang dynasty, who were opposed to the Zhou conquest.

Volume three 
It includes the Fu Yue zhi ming 傅說之命, Command to Fu Yue; the *Liang chen 良臣, the Zhu ci 祝辭, among others.

Volume seven 
It includes "Zi Fan Zi Yu" 子犯子餘, "Jin Wen Gong ru yu Jin" 晉文公入於晉, "Zhao jianzi" 趙簡子, "Yue Gong qi shi" 越公其事.

 "Zi fan Zi Yu" 子犯子餘 records a dialogue between Zi Fan and Duke Mu of Qin. This takes place while Chong'er is in exile, traveling from state to state.
 "Jin Wen gong ru yu Jin" 晉文公入於晉 narrates the story of the Duke Wen of Jin (posthumous name of the aforementioned Chong'er) returning to his state after years of battle, and putting it in order.

Volume eight 
It includes eight texts: "She ming" 攝命, "Bang jia zhi zheng" 邦家之政, "Bang jia chu wei" 邦家處位, "Xin shi wei zhong" 心是謂中, "Tianxia zhi dao" 天下之道, "Ba qi wu wei wu si wu xing zhi shu" 八氣五味五祀五行之屬, and "Yu Xia Yin Shang zhi zhi" 虞夏殷商之治.

 "She ming" 攝命, *Command to She. Titled by the editors. 32 strips. It purports to be a royal command to a certain She. It is written in shu 書 style. The editors identified it as the "original" Shangshu chapter Jiong Ming 囧命.
 "Xin shi wei zhong" 心是謂中. *The heart is what is at the center, a short (8 strips) text of philosophical nature discussing the heart-mind (xin 心) as the central organ in charge of the body, but also the concept of "luck" and mandate (ming 命). It includes the statement that humans are in charge of their destiny, so far otherwise unattested.

Decimal multiplication table

Twenty-one bamboo strips of the Tsinghua Bamboo Strips, when assembled in the correct order, represent a decimal multiplication table that can be used to multiply numbers (any whole or half integer) up to 99.5.

Joseph Dauben of the City University of New York called it "the earliest artefact of a decimal multiplication table in the world". According to Guo Shuchun, director of the Chinese Society of the History of Mathematics, those strips filled a historical gap for mathematical documents prior to the Qin Dynasty. "It helps establish the place-value system, a crucial development in the history of math", as Professor Wen Xing of Dartmouth College explains. It is presumed that officials used the multiplication table to calculate land surface area, yields of crops and the amounts of taxes owed.

See also
 Guodian Chu Strips
 Shuanggudui
 Yinqueshan Han Strips
 Zhangjiashan Han bamboo texts

References

Citations

Sources 

 
 

4th-century BC manuscripts
2008 archaeological discoveries
Bamboo and wooden slips
Archaeological artifacts of China
Chinese mathematics
Multiplication
Chu (state)
Tsinghua University